Ust-Muny (Inı) is a rural locality (a selo) and the administrative centre of Ust-Munynskoye Rural Settlement of Mayminsky District, the Altai Republic, Russia. The population was 445 as of 2016. There are 19 streets.

Geography 
Ust-Muny is located on the Katun River, 47 km south of Mayma (the district's administrative centre) by road. Barangol is the nearest rural locality.

References 

Rural localities in Mayminsky District